Zekelita ravalis is a moth of the family Erebidae first described by Gottlieb August Wilhelm Herrich-Schäffer in 1851. It is found in the Near East and Middle East, Kazakhstan, Kirghizia, Pakistan, Afghanistan, Egypt, Bahrain and the Levant.

References

"The Acronictinae, Bryophilinae, Hypenodinae and Hypeninae of Israel"

Hypeninae
Moths of Europe
Moths of the Middle East